Holy Trinity Twickenham is a Grade II listed Church of England church on Twickenham Green in Twickenham in the London Borough of Richmond upon Thames. Its vicar is Tim Garrett. The church building dates from 1841.

References

External links
Official website

19th-century Church of England church buildings
Twickenham
Grade II listed churches in the London Borough of Richmond upon Thames
Diocese of London
Churches in Twickenham